David Alex Parkin, OAM (born 12 September 1942) is a former Australian rules footballer and coach who played for the Hawthorn Football Club in the Victorian Football League (VFL) and for the Subiaco Football Club in the Western Australian National Football League (WANFL).

However, Parkin's stature in the history of Australian rules football is based mainly on his achievements as a coach. Building on his experience as a player and educator, Parkin won four premierships (one at Hawthorn, three at Carlton) and is considered one of the most influential coaches of the modern era.

Pre-football career 
Parkin was educated at Melbourne High School and during his time there, was the school vice-captain and captain of football.
He also attended Hawthorn West primary school, the birth place of his passion for Australian rules football.

Playing career

Hawthorn
Parkin was a tough back-pocket player who played 211 games for the Hawthorn Football Club (and kicked 21 goals) in a career spanning from 1961 to 1974. He won the Best and Fairest award for Hawthorn in 1965, and was captain of the club from 1969–1973, including Hawthorn's 1971 premiership winning side. He represented Victoria 5 times at interstate football.

Coaching career 
Parkin went to Western Australia and captain-coached Subiaco in 1975. He was back at Hawthorn as Assistant coach under senior coach John Kennedy in 1976. Kennedy retired at the end of 1976 and Parkin was promoted to senior coach.

Hawthorn Football Club senior coach (1977-1980)
Parkin replaced John Kennedy as Hawthorn Football Club senior coach after Kennedy stepped down. Parkin was senior coach with Hawthorn from 1977 to 1980 and became the second person to coach Hawthorn to a premiership in 1978.
However, The Hawks under Parkin in the 1980 season had a disappointing season, where they finished in eight place and therefore missed out of the finals.  After finding out that Hawthorn were looking around at other possible coaches to replace him, Parkin penned his letter of resignation as Hawthorn Football Club senior coach at the end of the 1980 season and hand delivered it into Glenferrie Oval. Parkin was then replaced by Allan Jeans as Hawthorn Football Club senior coach.

Carlton Football Club senior coach (1981-1985)
Parkin then replaced Peter Jones as senior coach of Carlton Football Club, at the end of the 1980 season. and coached Carlton in his first stint from 1981 to 1985 and winning back to back premierships. Firstly in 1981, when Parkin guided Carlton to a premiership victory against Collingwood by a margin of 20 points, in Parkin's first year as senior coach of Carlton and again in 1982, when Parkin guided Carlton to another premiership victory for the second straight consecutive year in a row, this time against Richmond by a margin of 18 points.
However, Carlton under Parkin in the 1985 season fell short of expectations and had a disappointing season, where Carlton were eliminated by North Melbourne in the elimination final. Parkin was sacked as Carlton Football Club senior coach at the end of the 1985 season and was replaced by Robert Walls in a jointly announced agreement with Fitzroy Football Club to swap senior coaches for 1986.

Fitzroy Football Club senior coach (1986-1988)
Parkin then replaced Robert Walls as senior coach of Fitzroy in a jointly announced agreement with Carlton Football Club to swap senior coaches. Parkin then coached Fitzroy from 1986 to 1988. Fitzroy under Parkin made the preliminary final in his first season at the Lions as senior coach, but failed to reach the finals in the following two years. Parkin was sacked by Fitzroy as senior coach at the end of the 1988 season.
Parkin was then replaced by Rod Austin as Fitzroy Football Club senior coach.

Carlton Football Club senior coach (1991-2000)
After Alex Jesaulenko stepped down as Carlton Football Club senior coach at the end of the 1990 season, Carlton President John Elliott offered Parkin the job. Parkin then returned to become the senior coach of Carlton for another stint from 1991 until 2000. He was named Carlton's Coach of the Century, and is regarded by Carlton supporters as the club's greatest ever coach, during this second stint, Parkin guided Carlton to win the 1995 premiership against Geelong by a margin of 61 points. He also took Carlton to Grand Finals in 1993 and 1999 which they lost to Essendon and North Melbourne, respectively, at the end of the 2000 season, Parkin retired as Carlton senior coach and handed the coaching reins to his assistant coach Wayne Brittain.

Hawthorn Football Club director of coaching (2001-2002)
Parkin then returned to Hawthorn in 2001 as director of coaching under senior coach Peter Schwab, where he continued until 30 October 2002, when he left the club after the end of the 2002 season. In 2003, he wrote a controversial article in the Herald-Sun labeling six Hawthorn players as Mummy's Boys because of their lightweight frames. Parkin believed players should be bigger, heavier and stronger. Three of those he listed, namely Michael Osborne, Rick Ladson and Chance Bateman went on to play in Hawthorn's 2008 Premiership.

Statistics

Playing statistics

|- style="background-color: #EAEAEA"
| scope="row" | 1961 ||  || 33
| 1 || 0 || 0 ||  ||  ||  ||  ||  || 0.0 || 0.0 ||  ||  ||  ||  ||  || 0
|-
| scope="row" | 1962 ||  || 27
| 10 || 3 || 0 ||  ||  ||  ||  ||  || 0.3 || 0.0 ||  ||  ||  ||  ||  || 3
|- style="background-color: #EAEAEA"
| scope="row" | 1963 ||  || 27
| 21 || 0 || 0 ||  ||  ||  ||  ||  || 0.0 || 0.0 ||  ||  ||  ||  ||  || 0
|-
| scope="row" | 1964 ||  || 27
| 13 || 2 || 0 ||  ||  ||  ||  ||  || 0.2 || 0.0 ||  ||  ||  ||  ||  || 0
|- style="background-color: #EAEAEA"
| scope="row" | 1965 ||  || 27
| 16 || 0 || 1 || 207 || 11 || 218 || 47 ||  || 0.0 || 0.1 || 12.9 || 0.7 || 13.6 || 2.9 ||  || 8
|-
| scope="row" | 1966 ||  || 27
| 14 || 0 || 5 || 205 || 19 || 224 || 43 ||  || 0.0 || 0.4 || 14.6 || 1.4 || 16.0 || 3.1 ||  || 4
|- style="background-color: #EAEAEA"
| scope="row" | 1967 ||  || 27
| 15 || 0 || 0 || 199 || 17 || 216 || 43 ||  || 0.0 || 0.0 || 13.3 || 1.1 || 14.4 || 2.9 ||  || 3
|-
| scope="row" | 1968 ||  || 27
| 18 || 3 || 2 || 243 || 14 || 257 || 41 ||  || 0.2 || 0.1 || 13.5 || 0.8 || 14.3 || 2.3 ||  || 12
|- style="background-color: #EAEAEA"
| scope="row" | 1969 ||  || 27
| 14 || 3 || 2 || 209 || 18 || 227 || 26 ||  || 0.2 || 0.1 || 14.9 || 1.3 || 16.2 || 1.9 ||  || 0
|-
| scope="row" | 1970 ||  || 27
| 19 || 0 || 0 || 265 || 30 || 295 || 66 ||  || 0.0 || 0.0 || 13.9 || 1.6 || 15.5 || 3.5 ||  || 5
|- style="background-color: #EAEAEA"
| scope="row" bgcolor=F0E68C | 1971# ||  || 27
| 22 || 0 || 0 || 313 || 37 || 350 || 83 ||  || 0.0 || 0.0 || 14.2 || 1.7 || 15.9 || 3.8 ||  || 6
|-
| scope="row" | 1972 ||  || 27
| 20 || 0 || 0 || 254 || 33 || 287 || 67 ||  || 0.0 || 0.0 || 12.7 || 1.7 || 14.4 || 3.4 ||  || 1
|- style="background-color: #EAEAEA"
| scope="row" | 1973 ||  || 27
| 15 || 3 || 5 || 210 || 42 || 252 || 47 ||  || 0.2 || 0.3 || 14.0 || 2.8 || 16.8 || 3.1 ||  || 9
|-
| scope="row" | 1974 ||  || 27
| 13 || 7 || 8 || 94 || 29 || 123 || 21 ||  || 0.5 || 0.6 || 7.2 || 2.2 || 9.5 || 1.6 ||  || 0
|- class="sortbottom"
! colspan=3| Career
! 211 !! 21 !! 23 !! 2199 !! 250 !! 2449 !! 484 !!  !! 0.1 !! 0.1 !! 13.2 !! 1.5 !! 14.7 !! 2.9 !!  !! 51
|}

Coaching statistics

|- style="background-color: #EAEAEA"
| scope="row" | 1977 || 
| 25 || 18 || 7 || 0 || 72.0% || 2 || 12
|-
| scope="row" bgcolor=F0E68C | 1978# || 
| 25 || 19 || 6 || 0 || 76.0% || 2 || 12
|- style="background-color: #EAEAEA"
| scope="row" | 1979 || 
| 22 || 10 || 12 || 0 || 45.5% || 7 || 12
|-
| scope="row" | 1980 || 
| 22 || 10 || 12 || 0 || 45.5% || 8 || 12
|- style="background-color: #EAEAEA"
| scope="row" bgcolor=F0E68C | 1981# || 
| 24 || 19 || 5 || 0 || 79.2% || 1 || 12
|-
| scope="row" bgcolor=F0E68C | 1982# || 
| 26 || 19 || 6 || 1 || 75.0% || 3 || 12
|- style="background-color: #EAEAEA"
| scope="row" | 1983 || 
| 23 || 13 || 10 || 0 || 56.5% || 5 || 12
|-
| scope="row" | 1984 || 
| 24 || 13 || 11 || 0 || 54.2% || 3 || 12
|- style="background-color: #EAEAEA"
| scope="row" | 1985 || 
| 23 || 15 || 8 || 0 || 65.2% || 4 || 12
|-
| scope="row" | 1986 || 
| 25 || 15 || 10 || 0 || 60.0% || 4 || 12
|- style="background-color: #EAEAEA"
| scope="row" | 1987 || 
| 22 || 8 || 14 || 0 || 36.4% || 11 || 14
|-
| scope="row" | 1988 || 
| 22 || 7 || 15 || 0 || 31.8% || 12 || 14
|- style="background-color: #EAEAEA"
| scope="row" | 1991 || 
| 22 || 8 || 14 || 0 || 36.4% || 11 || 15
|-
| scope="row" | 1992 || 
| 22 || 14 || 8 || 0 || 63.6% || 7 || 15
|- style="background-color: #EAEAEA"
| scope="row" | 1993 || 
| 23 || 15 || 7 || 1 || 67.4% || 2 || 15
|-
| scope="row" | 1994 || 
| 24 || 15 || 9 || 0 || 62.5% || 2 || 15
|- style="background-color: #EAEAEA"
| scope="row" bgcolor=F0E68C | 1995# || 
| 25 || 23 || 2 || 0 || 92.0% || 1 || 16
|-
| scope="row" | 1996 || 
| 24 || 15 || 9 || 0 || 62.5% || 5 || 16
|- style="background-color: #EAEAEA"
| scope="row" | 1997 || 
| 22 || 10 || 12 || 0 || 45.5% || 11 || 16
|-
| scope="row" | 1998 || 
| 22 || 9 || 13 || 0 || 40.9% || 11 || 16
|- style="background-color: #EAEAEA"
| scope="row" | 1999 || 
| 26 || 14 || 12 || 0 || 53.8% || 6 || 16
|-
| scope="row" | 2000 || 
| 25 || 17 || 8 || 0 || 68.0% || 2 || 16
|- class="sortbottom"
! colspan=2| Career totals
! 518 !! 306 !! 210 !! 2 !! 59.27% !! colspan=2|
|}

Honours and achievements

Playing 
Team
 VFL premiership player: 1971
 Minor premiership: 1971

Individual
 VFL premiership captain: 1971
 J.J. Dennis Memorial Trophy: 1965
 Hawthorn captain: 1969–1973
 Subiaco captain: 1975

Coaching 
Team
 VFL premiership coach: 1978
 3× VFL/AFL premiership coach: 1981, 1982, 1995
 2× Minor premiership: 1981, 1995
 AFC Night Series premiership: 1977

Individual
 4× Jock McHale Medal: 1978, 1981, 1982, 1995
 All-Australian team: 1995
 VFL Team of the Year: 1982
 Victoria Australian rules football team: 1990
 Carlton Team of the Century

Hall of Fame/Life membership 
 Australian Football Hall of Fame
 Hawthorn Hall of Fame – Legend status
 Carlton Hall of Fame
 Hawthorn life member
 Carlton life member

Post-coaching career 
Parkin is currently a media commentator who has appeared on Talking Footy on the Seven Network and a commentator for ABC Radio. He was a panellist on Fox Footy's now defunct show, Fox League Teams.

He is a lecturer in Sports and Exercise Science at Deakin University, Melbourne campus. In honour of his significant contribution to Australian society in leadership, sport and education, Deakin University also established the annual David Parkin Oration for Sport and Social Change. He holds a Bachelor of Education from the University of Western Australia.

He was diagnosed with prostate cancer and underwent surgery in March 2009.

Recognition 
He received an Australian Sports Medal in 2000 and a Medal of the Order of Australia in 2013. In 2002 he was inducted into the Australian Football Hall of Fame. He was inducted into the Sport Australia Hall of Fame in 2010.

References

External links 

1942 births
Living people
All-Australian coaches
Australian Football Hall of Fame inductees
Carlton Football Club coaches
Carlton Football Club Premiership coaches
Hawthorn Football Club coaches
Hawthorn Football Club Premiership coaches
Hawthorn Football Club players
Hawthorn Football Club Premiership players
Fitzroy Football Club coaches
Subiaco Football Club players
Subiaco Football Club coaches
Australia international rules football team coaches
Peter Crimmins Medal winners
People educated at Melbourne High School
University of Western Australia alumni
Australian rules footballers from Victoria (Australia)
Recipients of the Medal of the Order of Australia
Recipients of the Australian Sports Medal
Sport Australia Hall of Fame inductees
Academic staff of Deakin University
One-time VFL/AFL Premiership players
Australian rules football commentators
Four-time VFL/AFL Premiership coaches